Hyon Mu-gwang (1913 - March 1992) was a North Korean politician, deputy prime minister of the State Administration of Government, member of the  of North Korea and chairman of the National Audit Committee.

Biography
Hyon Mu-gwang was born in Hongyuan County, south-central South Hamgyong Province. In his early years, he worked as a worker in a factory in Seoul. During the Japanese occupation, he was forced to requisition to work in a steel plant in Chongjin City. In 1937, he joined the National Liberation League and engaged in the communist movement. He was subsequently arrested by the Japanese colonial government and sentenced to prison. In 1945, Japan surrendered and World War II ended, 

In 1956, Hyon returned, and immediately became the vice chairman of Xianjing South Road. In the same year, he was elected as acting member of the Supreme People's Assembly. He was re-elected to this position 7 times. In 1958, he was promoted to chairman of South Hamgyong Province. In 1960, he was appointed Minister of Heavy Industry of the Party Central Committee. In 1962, he was relocated to the chairman of North Hamgyong Province. The following year, he was promoted to the chairman of the Machinery Industry Committee (later the Minister of the Machinery Industry).

In 1984, Hyon was promoted to deputy prime minister of the Government Administration. Two years later, he was appointed chairman of the National Audit Committee. In recognition of his contribution to rebuilding North Korea's heavy industry and developing military industry, the Pyongyang government awarded him the Order of Kim Il-sung and the title of "Hero of the Republic". He has also visited the Soviet Union, China and East Germany many times on behalf of North Korea. He died in March 1992. The Pyongyang government held a state funeral for him and was buried in Revolutionary Martyrs' Cemetery.

References

1913 births
1992 deaths
People from North Hamgyong
Government ministers of North Korea
Alternate members of the 5th Politburo of the Workers' Party of Korea
Alternate members of the 6th Politburo of the Workers' Party of Korea
Members of the 6th Central Committee of the Workers' Party of Korea